The Indonesia national handball team is the national team of Indonesia. It is governed by the Indonesia Handball Association and takes part in international handball competitions.

Competitive record

Asian Games
2018 – 12th place

External links
IHF profile

Men's national handball teams
H